Ganes may refer to:

Ganes (band), North Italian pop trio singing in the minority Ladin language
Ganes (film), 2007 biopic about the Finnish rock band Hurriganes
Ganes, a creek in Ophir, Alaska